Stalinka may refer to:

 A type of postconstructivist building characteristic of Stalinist architecture
 Stalin tunic, a jacket popularized by Joseph Stalin